Admir is a Bosnian masculine given name. People with the name include:

 Admir Adrović,  Montenegrin footballer
 Admir Adžem, Bosnian footballer
 Admir Aganović, Bosnian footballer
 Admir Bilibani, Bosnian footballer
 Admir Ćatović, Swedish footballer
 Admir Hasančić, Bosnian footballer
 Admir Haznadar, Bosnian-Dutch footballer
 Admir Ljevaković, Bosnian footballer
 Admir Mehmedi, Swiss footballer
 Admir Raščić, Bosnian footballer
 Admir Salihović, Bosnian-Canadian footballer
 Admir Šarčević Bosnian footballer (retired)
 Admir Smajić,  Bosnian footballer
 Admir Softić, Bosnian footballer
 Admir Teli, Albanian footballer
 Admir Velagić, Bosnian footballer
 Admir Vladavić, Bosnian footballer

See also

 Admiral (disambiguation)
 Admire
Almir (given name)
 Amir (disambiguation)

Bosnian masculine given names